Woi (Wooi) is a Malayo-Polynesian language of Papua, Indonesia mainly spoken in the villages of Wooi and Woinap on Yapen Island and the village of Yenuari on Moisnum Island.

References

Further reading

External links 
 Paradisec has an open access collection from Emily Gasser that includes Woi language materials

South Halmahera–West New Guinea languages
Languages of western New Guinea